Ancistrus stigmaticus is a species of catfish in the family Loricariidae. It is native to South America, where it occurs in the Araguaia River basin in Brazil. The species reaches 15.2 cm (6 inches) SL.

References 

stigmaticus
Fish described in 1889